The Nigeria national badminton team represents Nigeria in international badminton team competitions. It is managed by the Badminton Federation of Nigeria (BFN). Nigeria have won the African Men's Team Championships three times. The Nigerian mixed team were the champions of the 2019 African Badminton Championships mixed team event.

Participation in BWF competitions 

 Thomas Cup

 Sudirman Cup

African Games 
Nigeria made its debut at the African Games since its inaugural edition in Abuja 2003. Nigeria has won the mixed team title in 2007, 2011, and 2019.

Participation in African Badminton Championships 

Men's team

Mixed team

Players 

Male players
Anuoluwapo Juwon Opeyori
Godwin Olofua
Clement Krobakpo
Enejoh Abah
Habeeb Temitope Bello
Usman Ayo Isiaq

Female players
Dorcas Ajoke Adesokan
Peace Orji
Uchechukwu Deborah Ukeh
Zainab Momoh

References

External links

Badminton
National badminton teams
Badminton in Nigeria